Adelaide of Rheinfelden (or Adelaide of Swabia) (1060s – May 1090), was Queen Consort of Hungary by marriage to King Ladislaus I of Hungary.

Life
Adelaide was born circa 1065 to Rudolf of Rheinfelden, duke of Swabia and German anti-king, and his second wife, Adelaide of Savoy. Her maternal aunt was Bertha of Savoy, who was married to Henry IV of Germany.

Around 1077/8 Adelaide married Ladislaus I of Hungary, a member of the Árpád dynasty. Ladislaus agreed to support Rudolf in his struggle for the throne against Henry IV of Germany. In 1079 Adelaide's mother died, followed in 1080 by her father, who fell at the Battle of Elster.

In 1081 Pope Gregory VII wrote to Adelaide, urging her to encourage her husband to support monasteries and be generous to the poor and the weak.

Adelaide died in May 1090; her husband outlived her by 5 years. She was buried in Veszprém, where her gravestone remains.

Issue
Adelaide had two children:
 Piroska of Hungary (c. 1080 – August 13, 1134), wife of John II, emperor of the Byzantine Empire
 Unknown daughter (? – ?), wife of Prince Yaroslav of Volhynia.

References
E. Hlawitschka, ‘Zur Herkunft und zu den Seitenverwandten des Gegenkönigs Rudolf,’ in Die Salier und das Reich, I, pp. 175–220

External links
Medieval Lands Project: Northern Italy, 900–1100.
Epistolae: Medieval Women's Latin Letters: Adelaide of Swabia (Brief biography, and English translation of a letter written to Adelaide by Pope Gregory VII)
 Women in World History: A Biographical Encyclopedia: "Adelaide of Rheinfelden (c. 1065–?)" (subscription required)
Adelheid von Rheinfelden, Königin von Ungarn (in German)

Notes

|-

Hungarian queens consort
1090 deaths
1060s births
Place of birth unknown
Place of death unknown
Daughters of kings